Frangiskos Mavrommatis (born 13 January 1870, date of death unknown) was a Greek sport shooter who competed at the 1906 Intercalated Games, the 1908 Summer Olympics and the 1912 Summer Olympics.

He was born in Chios.

1906 Athens

In the 1906 Summer Olympics he participated in the following events:

 Free rifle teams - fourth place
 20 m duelling pistol - sixth place
 200 m army rifle - ninth place
 50 m pistol - twelfth place
 25 m army pistol (1873 model) - 14th place
 25 m rapid fire pistol - 14th place
 300 m army rifle - 17th place
 25 m army pistol (standard model) - 23rd place
 Free rifle, free position - 27th place

1908 London

In the 1908 Summer Olympics he participated in the following events:

 Team military rifle - seventh place
 Team pistol - seventh place
 Team free rifle - ninth place
 Individual pistol - 25th place

1912 Stockholm

Four years later at the 1912 Summer Olympics he participated in the following events:

 Team 25 metre small-bore rifle - fourth place
 Team 50 metre small-bore rifle - fifth place
 Team 50 metre military pistol - fifth place
 Team 30 metre military pistol - fifth place
 Team military rifle - seventh place
 300 metre military rifle, three positions - 17th place
 25 metre small-bore rifle - 18th place
 600 metre free rifle - 22nd place
 50 metre pistol - 26th place
 30 metre rapid fire pistol - 29th place
 50 metre rifle, prone - 34th place

References

External links
 profile

1870 births
Year of death missing
Greek male sport shooters
ISSF pistol shooters
ISSF rifle shooters
Olympic shooters of Greece
Shooters at the 1906 Intercalated Games
Shooters at the 1908 Summer Olympics
Shooters at the 1912 Summer Olympics
Sportspeople from Chios